Denmark has participated in the Eurovision Song Contest 50 times, making its first appearance in . Since , it has been absent from only four contests. The Danish national selection for the contest is the Dansk Melodi Grand Prix.

Denmark won the contest for the second time in 2000 with the Olsen Brothers and the song "Fly on the Wings of Love". Denmark won the contest for the third time in 2013, with "Only Teardrops" performed by Emmelie de Forest. Denmark has placed in the top five 14 times.

History

Denmark's debut 
Denmark first participated at the Eurovision Song Contest 1957, held in Frankfurt, Germany. The country had intended to compete at the first contest in 1956, but had submitted its application past the deadline and was, therefore, not allowed to compete. Denmark was the first Nordic country to take part in the contest, with Sweden, Norway and Finland following soon after. Iceland, however, did not take part until 1986.

Denmark's first participants were Birthe Wilke and Gustav Winckler, who sang the song "". Their performance was controversial as, at the end of the song, the couple performed an 11-second kiss, which caused outcry in some countries. Nevertheless, the performance achieved third place.

First victory 
Denmark won the contest for the first time in 1963, when Grethe and Jørgen Ingmann sang "". The victory, however, was controversial. When Norway announced its votes, the presenter Katie Boyle had to correct the spokesperson and said that she would call them again later. Viewers around Europe could then see the votes had been changed, changing the outcome of the contest and giving the victory to Denmark at the expense of Switzerland. In fact, the reason why Norway had to announce its votes again was that the Norwegian spokesperson did not follow the right procedure the first time and, therefore, there was doubt whether he gave the correct votes on the first occasion.

The final result was valid and the victory went to Denmark. Accordingly, in 1964, the contest was held in Denmark for the first time.

Absence and return 
After the 1966 contest and a record low 14th place, Denmark withdrew from the contest, as DR's new head of entertainment Niels Jørgen Kaiser did not view the contest as being quality entertainment. Dansk Melodi Grand Prix was not held from that year onwards.

However, in the 1978 contest, after 11 years' absence, and following Niels Jørgen Kaisers departure from DR, Denmark returned to the contest, represented by Mabel and the song "Boom Boom".

Success 
Denmark's most successful time at the contest came between 1984 and 1990, with the country reaching the top eight in six out of seven contests, including four top-five placings. The duo of Hot Eyes represented the nation three times during this period. In 1984, they sang the song "" and finished fourth. In 1985, they became the first and, as of 2020 only act to represent Denmark in two consecutive years. Singing "", they could not repeat their success of the previous year and came 11th. In 1988, Hot Eyes represented Denmark again with "". The duo scored its best result to date, finishing in third place, losing only to Céline Dion and Scott Fitzgerald. Denmark's other good results during this time were sixth place for Lise Haavik in 1986, fifth for Anne-Cathrine Herdorf and Bandjo in 1987, third for Birthe Kjær in 1989 and eighth for Lonnie Devantier in 1990.

Denmark's fall 
After 1990, Denmark fell from its high positions of the 1980s and was relegated from the contest on three occasions in the 1990s. In 1993, Tommy Seebach, who had previously represented Denmark in 1979 and 1981, finished 22nd, resulting Denmark being relegated from the contest in 1994. Aud Wilken sang "" for the nation at the 1995 contest and came 5th, but this high placing could not be repeated in 1996, as Denmark's entry, "" sung by Dorthe Andersen and Martin Loft, did not qualify from the pre-qualifying round of the contest. In 1998, Denmark was once again relegated from the contest following a poor result in 1997. In 1999, the abolition of the language rule, which had required all countries to sing in their official languages, brought a return to success for Denmark, when Michael Teschl and Trine Jepsen finished 8th with "This Time I Mean It".

2000s and 2010s 
In 2000, Denmark won the contest with brothers Jørgen and Niels Olsen defying the odds (they were considerably older than their competitors and only one male duo had won before), to win with "Fly on the Wings of Love". The song went on to enjoy huge success around Europe.

At the 2001 contest, held in Copenhagen, Rollo and King came second with the song "Never Ever Let You Go". However, in 2002, Malene Mortensen came 24th (last) with "Tell Me Who You Are", giving Denmark its worst result ever. Therefore, Denmark was relegated from the 2003 contest.

In 2005, Copenhagen hosted Congratulations: 50 Years of the Eurovision Song Contest, an event to commemorate the 50th anniversary.

Since the introduction of semifinals in 2004, Denmark has qualified for the final on eleven out of 16 occasions. Another string of successful participations started in 2010, when Denmark reached the top five for the first time in nine years, finishing fourth with "In a Moment like This" performed by Chanée and N'evergreen. A year later, Denmark finished fifth with "New Tomorrow" performed by the band A Friend in London, and in 2013, Denmark won the contest for the third time, when Emmelie de Forest represented the country with the song "Only Teardrops", winning with Denmark's highest-ever score of 281 points.

In 2014, Denmark reached the top ten for the fourth time in five years, when Basim finished ninth. However, the success did not continue into 2015 and 2016, as Denmark failed to qualify for the final in those years. In 2017, the country returned to the final, finishing 20th with Anja Nissen. Denmark achieved its fifth top ten result of the decade in 2018, with Rasmussen and the song "Higher Ground" finishing ninth. In 2019, Leonora took Denmark to their 12th final with the song "Love Is Forever" and finished 12th in the final with 120 points.

2020s 
In 2021, the duo Fyr og Flamme with "Øve os på hinanden" - Denmark's first entry fully in Danish since 1997 - failed to qualify for the final, finishing 11th in the second semi-final with 89 points. Another non-qualification followed with Reddi and "The Show" in 2022.

Participation overview

Congratulations: 50 Years of the Eurovision Song Contest

Hostings

Congratulations: 50 Years of the Eurovision Song Contest

Awards

Winner by OGAE members

Related involvement

Conductors

Additionally, a live band has performed at the Danish national final since 2020, led by Peter Düring.

Heads of delegation

Commentators and spokespersons

Gallery

See also
Dansk Melodi Grand Prix
Dansk Melodi Grand Prix winners
Denmark in the Eurovision Choir of the Year – A competition organised by the EBU for non-professional choirs.
Denmark in the Eurovision Dance Contest – Dance version of the Eurovision Song Contest.
Denmark in the Eurovision Young Dancers – A competition organised by the EBU for younger dancers aged between 16 and 21.
Denmark in the Eurovision Young Musicians – A competition organised by the EBU for musicians aged 18 years and younger.
Denmark in the Junior Eurovision Song Contest – Junior version of the Eurovision Song Contest.
Faroe Islands in the Eurovision Song Contest
Greenland in the Eurovision Song Contest

Notes

References

 
Countries in the Eurovision Song Contest